HTMS Saiburi (FFG-458) is the fourth ship of  of the Royal Thai Navy, a variant of the Chinese-built Type 053H2 frigate.

Design and description 
Saiburi has a complement of 168 personnel, including 22 officers.

As a Type 053HT (H) frigate, the ship were armed with one 100 mm/56 Type 79 twin-barreled gun and four 37 mm Type 76 twin-barreled guns. For anti-submarine warfare, the ship is equipped with two Type 86 anti-submarine rocket launchers and two BMB depth charge racks. For surface warfare, Saiburi was equipped with eight C-801 anti-ship missile launchers. She also has a flight deck and able to carry a helicopter, although the ship didn't have a hangar.

Saiburi underwent modernization program in 2009. The upgrade includes replacement of old weapons and electronic systems with newer systems, such as new 100 mm/56 Type 79A twin-barreled gun and 37 mm Type 76A twin-barreled remote-controlled guns along with their respective fire control radars and the installation of new C-802A anti-ship missiles.

Construction and career 
The four ships of the class was ordered on 18 July 1988. Saiburi was laid down somewhere in 1990 at Hudong Shipyard, Shanghai. The ship was launched on 27 August 1991 and was commissioned on 4 August 1992. Upon the ship completion and arrival on Thailand, the shipbuilding quality were deemed to be unsatisfactory and works was needed to improve the ship. The damage control abilities were also upgraded before she entered service.

Upon entering service, Saiburi and her sisters were frequently used for training and rotated monthly to the Coast Guard.

The ship took part in a humanitarian assistance operation in May 2015 by providing food, water, fuel and medical help to the Rohingya and Bengali migrants found adrift on boats in the Andaman Sea to keep them able continuing the journey and prevent them from landing on Thai shores.

On 21–30 March 2022, Saiburi and  along with a Thai navy S-76B helicopter took part in Exercise Singsiam 2022 with the Republic of Singapore Navy. The sea phase of the exercise were held in the Malacca Strait and Andaman Sea.

References

Printed sources 
 
 
 

Ships built in China
1991 ships
Chao Phraya-class frigates